Rancho San Miguel is a Neighborhood in Walnut Creek, California. It is named after the Alta California Rancho Rancho Arroyo de Las Nueces y Bolbones which was also referred to as Rancho San Miguel. Until the mid-1950s the area consisted largely of walnut orchards, until developer Joseph Eichler built a subdivision north of Shell Ridge and Ygnacio Valley Road.

External links
Rancho San Miguel Homeowner's Association
Rancho San Miguel Swim Club
Diseño del Rancho San Miguel at The Bancroft Library

California ranchos
Neighborhoods in Walnut Creek, California